The rating system of the Royal Navy and its predecessors was used by the Royal Navy between the beginning of the 17th century and the middle of the 19th century to categorise sailing warships, initially classing them according to their assigned complement of men, and later according to the number of their carriage-mounted guns.  The rating system of the Royal Navy formally came to an end in the late 19th century by declaration of the Admiralty. The main cause behind this declaration focused on new types of gun, the introduction of steam propulsion and the use of iron and steel armour which made rating ships by the number of guns obsolete.

Origins and description
The first movement towards a rating system may be seen in the 15th century and the first half of the 16th century, when the largest carracks in the Navy (such as the Mary Rose, the Peter Pomegranate and the Henri Grâce à Dieu) were denoted "great ships". This was only on the basis of their roughly-estimated size and not on their weight, crew or number of guns. When these carracks were superseded by the new-style galleons later in the 16th century, the term "great ship" was used to formally delineate the Navy's largest ships from all the rest.

The Stuart era
The earliest categorisation of Royal Navy ships dates to the reign of King Henry VIII. Henry's Navy consisted of 58 ships, and in 1546 the Anthony Roll divided them into four groups: 'ships, galliasses, pinnaces, and row barges.'"

The formal system of dividing up the Navy's combatant warships into a number or groups or "rates", however, only originated in the very early part of the Stuart era, with the first lists of such categorisation appearing around 1604. At this time the combatant ships of the "Navy Royal" were divided up according to the number of men required to man them at sea (i.e. the size of the crew) into four groups:

 Royal Ships (the largest ships in the previous "great ships" grouping) mounting 42–55 guns and carrying at least 400 men;
 Great Ships (the rest of the ships in the previous "great ships" grouping) mounting 38–40 guns;
 Middling ships mounting 30–32 guns; and
 Small ships mounting fewer than 30 guns

A 1612 list referred to four groups: royal, middling, small and pinnaces; but defined them by tonnage instead of by guns, starting from 800 to 1200 tons for the ships royal, down to below 250 tons for the pinnaces.

By the early years of King Charles I's reign, these four groups had been renamed to a numerical sequence.  The royal ships were now graded as first rank, the great ships as second rank, the middling ships as third rank, and the small ships as fourth rank. Soon afterwards, the structure was again modified, with the term rank now being replaced by rate, and the former small ships now being sub-divided into fourth, fifth and sixth rates.

The earliest rating was based not on the number of guns, but on the established complement (number of men). In 1626, a table drawn up by Charles I used the term rates for the first time in a classification scheme connected with the Navy. The table specified the amount of monthly wages a seaman or officer would earn, in an ordered scheme of six rates, from "first-rate" to "sixth-rate", with each rate divided into two classes, with differing numbers of men assigned to each class.  No specific connection with the size of the ship or number of armaments aboard was given in this 1626 table, and as far as is known, this was related exclusively to seaman pay grades.

This classification scheme was substantially altered in late 1653 as the complements of individual ships were raised. From about 1660 the classification moved from one based on the number of men to one based on the number of carriage guns a ship carried.

Samuel Pepys, then Secretary to the Admiralty, revised the structure in 1677 and laid it down as a "solemn, universal and unalterable" classification. The rating of a ship was of administrative and military use. The number and weight of guns determined the size of crew needed, and hence the amount of pay and rations needed. It also indicated whether a ship was powerful enough to stand in the line of battle. Pepys's original classification was updated by further definitions in 1714, 1721, 1760, 1782, 1801 and 1817 (the last being the most severe, as it provided for including in the count of guns the carronades that had previously been excluded). On the whole the trend was for each rate to have a greater number of guns. For instance, Pepys allowed a first rate 90–100 guns, but on the 1801 scheme a first rate had 100–120. A sixth rate's range went from 4–18 to 20–28 (after 1714 any ship with fewer than 20 guns was unrated).

First, second and third rates (ships of the line)
A first-, second- or third-rate ship was regarded as a "ship-of-the-line". The first and second rates were three-deckers; that is, they had three continuous decks of guns (on the lower deck, middle deck and upper deck), usually as well as smaller weapons on the quarterdeck, forecastle and poop.

The largest third rates, those of 80 guns, were likewise three-deckers from the 1690s until the early 1750s, but both before this period and subsequent to it, 80-gun ships were built as two-deckers. All the other third rates, with 74 guns or less, were likewise two-deckers, with just two continuous decks of guns (on the lower deck and upper deck), as well as smaller weapons on the quarterdeck, forecastle and (if they had one) poop. A series of major changes to the rating system took effect from the start of January 1817, when the carronades carried by each ship were included in the count of guns (previously these had usually been omitted); the first rate from that date included all of the three-deckers (the adding in of their carronades had meant that all three-deckers now had over 100 guns), the new second rate included all two-deckers of 80 guns or more, with the third rate reduced to two-deckers of fewer than 80 guns.

Fourth, fifth and sixth rates
The smaller fourth rates, of about 50 or 60 guns on two decks, were ships-of-the-line until 1756, when it was felt that such 50-gun ships were now too small for pitched battles. The larger fourth rates of 60 guns continued to be counted as ships-of-the-line, but few new ships of this rate were added, the 60-gun fourth rate being superseded over the next few decades by the 64-gun third rate. The Navy did retain some fourth rates for convoy escort, or as flagships on far-flung stations; it also converted some East Indiamen to that role.

The smaller two deckers originally blurred the distinction between a fourth rate and a fifth rate. At the low end of the fourth rate one might find the two-decker 50-gun ships from about 1756. The high end of the fifth rate would include two-deckers of 40- or 44-guns (from 1690) or even the demi-batterie 32-gun and 36-gun ships of the 1690–1730 period. The fifth rates at the start of the 18th century were generally "demi-batterie" ships, carrying a few heavy guns on their lower deck (which often used the rest of the lower deck for row ports) and a full battery of lesser guns on the upper deck. However, these were gradually phased out, as the low freeboard (i.e., the height of the lower deck gunport sills above the waterline) meant that in rough weather it was often impossible to open the lower deck gunports.

Fifth and sixth rates were never included among ships-of-the-line. The middle of the 18th century saw the introduction of a new fifth-rate type—the classic frigate, with no ports on the lower deck, and the main battery disposed solely on the upper deck, where it could be fought in all weathers.

Sixth-rate ships were generally useful as convoy escorts, for blockade duties and the carrying of dispatches; their small size made them less suited for the general cruising tasks the fifth-rate frigates did so well. Essentially there were two groups of sixth rates. The larger category comprised the sixth-rate frigates of 28 guns, carrying a main battery of twenty-four 9-pounder guns, as well as four smaller guns on their superstructures. The second comprised the "post ships" of between 20 and 24 guns. These were too small to be formally counted as frigates (although colloquially often grouped with them), but still required a post-captain (i.e. an officer holding the substantive rank of captain) as their commander.

Unrated vessels
The rating system did not handle vessels smaller than the sixth rate. The remainder were simply "unrated". The larger of the unrated vessels were generally all called sloops, but that nomenclature is quite confusing for unrated vessels, especially when dealing with the finer points of "ship-sloop", "brig-sloop", "sloop-of-war" (which really just meant the same in naval parlance as "sloop") or even "corvette" (the last a French term that the British Navy did not use until the 1840s). Technically the category of "sloop-of-war" included any unrated combatant vessel—in theory, the term even extended to bomb vessels and fire ships. During the Napoleonic Wars, the Royal Navy increased the number of sloops in service by some 400% as it found that it needed vast numbers of these small vessels for escorting convoys (as in any war, the introduction of convoys created a huge need for escort vessels), combating privateers, and themselves taking prizes.

The number of guns and the rate
The rated number of guns often differed from the number a vessel actually carried. The guns that determined a ship's rating were the carriage-mounted cannon, long-barreled, muzzle-loading guns that moved on 'trucks'—wooden wheels. The count did not include smaller (and basically anti-personnel) weapons such as swivel-mounted guns ("swivels"), which fired half-pound projectiles, or small arms. For instance, HMS Cynthia was rated for 18 guns but during construction her rating was reduced to 16 guns (6-pounders), and she also carried 14 half-pound swivels.

Vessels might also carry other guns that did not contribute to the rating. Examples of such weapons would include mortars, howitzers or boat guns, the boat guns being small guns intended for mounting on the bow of a vessel's boats to provide fire support during landings, cutting out expeditions, and the like. From 1778, however, the most important exception was the carronade.

Introduced in the late 1770s, the carronade was a short-barreled and relatively short-range gun, half the weight of equivalent long guns, and was generally mounted on a slide rather than on trucks. The new carronades were generally housed on a vessel's upperworks—quarterdeck and forecastle—some as additions to its existing ordnance and some as replacements. When the carronades replaced or were in lieu of carriage-mounted cannon they generally counted in arriving at the rating, but not all were, and so may or may not have been included in the count of guns, though rated vessels might carry up to twelve 18-, 24- or 32-pounder carronades. For instance, HMS Armada was rated as a third rate of 74 guns. She carried twenty-eight 32-pounder guns on her gundeck, twenty-eight 18-pounder guns on her upperdeck, four 12-pounder guns and ten 32-pounder carronades on her quarterdeck, two 12-pounder guns and two 32-pounder carronades on her forecastle, and six 18-pounder carronades on her poop deck. In all, this 74-gun vessel carried 80 cannon: 62 guns and 18 carronades.

When carronades became part (or in some cases all) of a ship's main armament, they had to be included in the count of guns. For instance, Bonne Citoyenne was a 20-gun corvette of the French Navy that the British captured and recommissioned in the Royal navy as the 20-gun sloop and post ship HMS Bonne Citoyenne. She carried two 9-pounder cannon and eighteen 32-pounder carronades.

By the Napoleonic Wars there was no exact correlation between formal gun rating and the actual number of cannons any individual vessel might carry. One therefore needs to distinguish between the established armament of a vessel (which rarely altered) and the actual guns carried, which might happen quite frequently for a variety of reasons; guns might be lost overboard during a storm, or "burst" in service and thus useless, or jettisoned to speed the ship during a chase, or indeed removed down into the hold in order to use the ship (temporarily) as a troop transport, or for a small vessel, such as the schooner , to lower the centre of gravity and thus improve stability in bad weather. Also some of the guns were removed from a ship during peacetime service, to reduce the stress on the ship's structure, which is why there was actually a distinction between the wartime complement of guns (and men) and the lower peacetime complement—the figure normally quoted for any vessel is the highest (wartime) establishment.

Royal Navy rating system in force during the Napoleonic Wars

Notes
The smaller fourth-rates, primarily the 50-gun ships, were, from 1756 on, no longer classified as ships of the line. Since not big enough to stand in the line of battle, were often called frigates, though not classed as frigates by the Royal Navy. They were generally classified, like all smaller warships used primarily in the role of escort and patrol, as "cruisers", a term that covered everything from the smaller two-deckers down to the small gun-brigs and cutters.

The larger fifth-rates were generally two-decked ships of 40 or 44 guns, and thus not "frigates", although the 40-gun frigates built during the Napoleonic War also fell into this category.

The smaller sixth-rates were often popularly called frigates, though not classed as "frigates" by the Admiralty officially. Only the larger sixth-rates (those mounting 28 carriage guns or more) were technically frigates.

The ton in this instance is the burthen tonnage (bm). From c.1650 the burthen of a vessel was calculated using the formula , where  was the length, in feet, from the stem to the sternpost, and  the maximum breadth of the vessel. It was a rough measurement of cargo-carrying capacity by volume, not displacement. Therefore, one should not change a measurement in "tons burthen" into a displacement in "tons" or "tonnes".

1817 changes
In February 1817 the rating system changed. The recommendation from the Board of Admiralty to the Prince Regent was dated 25 November 1816, but the Order in Council establishing the new ratings was issued in February 1817. From February 1817 all carronades were included in the established number of guns.

1856 changes
There was a further major change in the rating system in 1856. From that date, the first rate comprised all ships carrying 110 guns and upwards, or the complement of which consisted of 1,000 men or more; the second rate included one of HM's royal yachts, and otherwise comprised all ships carrying under 110 guns but more than 80 guns, or the complements of which were under 1,000 but not less than 800 men; the third rate included all the rest of HM's royal yachts and "all such vessels as may bear the flag of pendant of any Admiral Superintendent or Captain Superintendent of one of HM's Dockyards", and otherwise comprised all ships carrying at most 80 guns but not less than 60 guns, or the complements of which were under 800 but not less than 600 men; the fourth rate comprised all frigate-built ships of which the complement was not more than 600 and not less than 410 men; the fifth rate comprised all ships of which the complement was not more than 400 and not less than 300 men; the sixth rate consisted of all other ships bearing a captain. Of unrated vessels, the category of sloops comprised all vessels commanded by commanders; next followed all other ships commanded by lieutenants, and having complements of not less than 60 men; finally were "smaller vessels, not classed as above, with such smaller complements as the Lords Commissioners of the Admiralty may from time to time direct".

Other classifications
Rating was not the only system of classification used. Through the early modern period, the term "ship" referred to a vessel that carried square sails on three masts. Sailing vessels with only two masts or a single mast were technically not "ships", and were not described as such at the time. Vessels with fewer than three masts were unrated sloops, generally two-masted vessels rigged as snows or ketches (in the first half of the 18th century), or brigs in succeeding eras. However some sloops were three-masted or "ship-rigged", and these were known as "ship sloops".

Vessels were sometimes classified according to the substantive rank of her commanding officer.  For instance, when the commanding officer of a gun-brig or even a cutter was a lieutenant with the status of master-and-commander, the custom was to recategorise the vessel as a sloop. For instance, when Pitt Burnaby Greene, the commanding officer of Bonne Citoyenne in 1811, received his promotion to post-captain, the Navy reclassed the sloop as a post ship.

Practices in other navies
Although the rating system described  was only used by the Royal Navy, other major navies used similar means of grading their warships. For example, the French Navy used a system of five rates ("rangs") which had a similar purpose. British authors might still use "first rate" when referring to the largest ships of other nations or "third rate" to speak of a French seventy-four. By the end of the 18th century, the rating system had mostly fallen out of common use (although technically it remained in existence for nearly another century), ships of the line usually being characterized directly by their nominal number of guns, the numbers even being used as the name of the type, as in "a squadron of three seventy-fours".

United States (1905)
As of 1905, ships of the United States Navy were by law divided into classes called rates. Vessels of the first rate had a displacement tonnage in excess of 8000 tons; second rate, from 4000 to 8000 tons; third rate, from 1000 to 4000 tons; and fourth rate, of less than 1000 tons. Converted merchant vessels that were armed and equipped as cruisers were of the second rate if over 6000 tons, and of the third rate if over 1000 and less than 6000 tons. Auxiliary vessels such as colliers, supply vessels, repair ships, etc., if over 4000 tons, were of the third rate. Auxiliary vessels of less than 4000 tons—except tugs, sailing ships, and receiving ships which were not rated—were of the fourth rate. Torpedo-boat destroyers, torpedo boats, and similar vessels were not rated. Captains commanded ships of the first rate; captains or commanders commanded ships of the second rate; commanders or lieutenant-commanders commanded ships of the third rate; lieutenant-commanders or lieutenants commanded ships of the fourth rate. Lieutenant-commanders, lieutenants, ensigns, or warrant officers might command unrated vessels, depending on the size of the vessel.

Other uses
The term first-rate has passed into general usage, as an adjective used to mean something of the best or highest quality available. Second-rate and third-rate are also used as adjectives to mean that something is of inferior quality.

Notes

References

Excerpts

Footnotes

Bibliography

External links
 Michael Philips, Ships of the Old Navy